Nature reserves deemed to be of national importance, or controlled by a national-level body may be known as national nature reserves.

China
Zhalong Nature Reserve in Heilongjiang province is designated as a national nature reserve by the Chinese government.

Czech Republic
Soos National Nature Reserve was designated as a nature reserve by the government of the Czech Republic.

Falkland Islands
Beauchêne Island was designated as a national nature reserve by the government of the Falkland Islands in 1964.

France

In France, national nature reserves have been designated since 1976, and are designated by a decree from either a minister or the Conseil d'Etat.  there are 168 natural nature reserves in France.

 Néouvielle National Nature Reserve

Isle of Man
Point of Ayre is designated as a national nature reserve by the Manx government.

Russia
The North-Ossetian National Nature Reserve in the Caucasus Mountains is designated as a national nature reserve by the Russian government.

United Kingdom

In the United Kingdom, "national nature reserves" are those designed by one of the national conservancy bodies, Natural England, Natural Resources Wales, NatureScot, or the Northern Ireland Environment Agency. In total, there are 386 national nature reserves in the UK.

References

Nature reserves